The Minister for State Insurance was a former cabinet member in New Zealand appointed by the Prime Minister to be responsible for New Zealand's state owned insurance scheme.

It was established in response to the founding of the State Fire Insurance Office in 1903 following a government decision for state involvement in the insurance industry. The portfolio existed until 1990 when, following its restructuring as a state owned enterprise, and it was sold to Norwich Union in 1990.

List of ministers
The following ministers have held the office of Minister for State Insurance.

Key

Notes

References

Mines
Insurance in New Zealand